The Ohio River Valley Conference is an Indiana High School Athletic Association-sanctioned conference located in Jefferson, Ohio, Ripley, and Switzerland counties. Formed in 1952, the conference has been fairly stable throughout its history, as five of the current seven members (or their precursors) are original members.

History
The ORVC traces its history to two conferences, the Southeastern Indiana and Laughery Valley. When the league began, two of its members came from the SEIC (Osgood, Versailles), a third (Rising Sun) had been in the SEIC before helping found the LVC, and a fourth (Milan) was a SEIC member until being removed from the conference in 1942, remaining independent since that point. The first shakeup in conference membership came in the conference's second year, as North closed, and two more LVC schools (Dillsboro, Moores Hill) joined with one SEIC school (Vevay). Hanover and Osgood consolidated with other local schools to become Southwestern and Jac-Cen-Del in 1960, with both staying in the league. Milan, a school that had dominated 1950's basketball and had football, moved to the Eastern Indiana Athletic Conference in 1962. They were replaced by two schools: Shawe Memorial in 1962, and Sunman in 1964. Versailles became South Ripley in 1966, with Vevay changing to Switzerland County in 1969.

The 1970s were a different story, as the three member schools would not survive to the end of the decade. Sunman was consolidated with North Dearborn in 1973, forming East Central. Dillsboro and Moores Hill would follow suit in 1978, combining with Aurora to form South Dearborn. Both of those schools had pre-consolidation ties to the Eastern Indiana Athletic Conference, and would retain their places in that conference. Left as a six-school conference, the ORVC welcomed founding member Milan back in 1985, as the former basketball power was struggling to keep up with larger rivals in the post-consolidation era. The conference has been stable since, a two-year hiatus by Southwestern in the mid-1990s notwithstanding. That stability looks to continue into the future. Lawrenceburg was denied entry in the 1990s, and there is only one other school in the area (Oldenburg Academy) who is of a similar size.

Membership

 Milan played in the Eastern Indiana Athletic Conference from 1962 to 1985.
 Southwestern played as an Independent from 1994 to 1996 after being removed from the conference for rules violations.

Former members

Membership timeline

Conference Championships

Boys Basketball 

 Champions for 1952–53, 1957–58, 1960–61, 1963–64, 1974–75, 1979–80, 1982–83, and 1989–90 are unverified.

Girls Basketball 

 Girls champions from 1976-77 until 1998-99 are unverified (except for 1983–84, South Ripley, and Switzerland County titles).

Boys Soccer

Girls Soccer 

 Girls conference champions not officially recognized until 2015

State Championships

Jac-Cen-Del (2)
 2009 Boys Basketball (A)
 2016 Girls Basketball (A)

Milan (1)
 1954 Boys Basketball

Southwestern (Hanover) (1)
 2002 Girls Basketball (2A)

Rising Sun (0)
 2000 Girls Basketball (2A) Runner-Up

Shawe Memorial (0)

South Ripley (0)

Switzerland County (0)

References

Resources 
 IHSAA Conferences
 IHSAA Directory

Indiana high school athletic conferences
High school sports conferences and leagues in the United States